Chohal is a census town in Hoshiarpur district  in the state of Punjab, India.

Demographics
 India census, Chohal had a population of 7,433. Males constitute 59% of the population and females 41%. Chohal has an average literacy rate of 71%, higher than the national average of 59.5%; with male literacy of 78% and female literacy of 62%. 16% of the population is under 6 years of age.

References

Cities and towns in Hoshiarpur district